Sarah Ann Long is an American librarian and columnist for The Daily Herald.  She frequently advocates for libraries and literacy.

Career 
Long served as director of the Multnomah County Library in Portland, OR; the Dauphin County Library System in Harrisburg, PA; and the Fairfield County District Library in Lancaster, OH. At the time of her election as president of the American Library Association she served as director of the North Suburban Library System--a consortium of 680 public, academic, and special libraries  headquartered in Wheeling, Illinois.  During her tenure, she frequently advocated for libraries, especially library funding.
 
Long served as a president of the American Library Association with a term that started in July 1999.  During her term, her theme was "Libraries build community." As part of her presidential year the American Library Association published A Place at the Table: Participating in Community Building in 2000 to establish the impact libraries should make in community engagement.

Honors and awards 
 Libraries and library systems under her direction have received the John Cotton Dana Award for excellence in public relations, presented annually by the American Library Association
 Librarian of the Year, Illinois Library Association, 1999
 Illinois Library Luminary award from the Illinois Library Association, 2009

References 

 

American librarians
American women librarians
American women non-fiction writers
Writers from Atlanta
Presidents of the American Library Association
21st-century American women writers
20th-century American women writers
20th-century American non-fiction writers
Living people
Year of birth missing (living people)